VBR may refer to:

Computing
 Variable bitrate, in telecommunications and computing, a non-constant sound or video encoding bitrate
 Volume boot record, in computer disks, a type of boot sector that contains code for bootstrapping programs
 Vouch by Reference, a standard way for email certification providers to vouch for outbound email sent by others

Other
 Reverse breakdown voltage, a diode characteristic in electronics